is a baseball stadium in the city of Nagasaki, Japan. The stadium was built in 1997 and has an all-seated capacity of 25,000. The Nagasaki Saints played some home games there. It is located about 320m from the epicenter of the nuclear bombing of Nagasaki.

References

Baseball venues in Japan
Sports venues in Nagasaki Prefecture
Buildings and structures in Nagasaki
Sports venues completed in 1997
1997 establishments in Japan